Sichuan Fine Arts Institute (SFAI) is a public fine arts university established in 1940 in the southwest City of Chonqing, China. It is one of the four most prominent art academies in China and the only one in southwest China.

History and reputation
Sichuan Fine Arts Institute has a history in the creation of art and research. Artwork has been created by the teachers at SFAI.

In the 1950s and 1960s, the institute was symbolized by handcraft arts. In the 1970s, it was sculpture, especially the most famous group statues, the “Rent Collecting Courtyard”. In the 1980s, it was oil painting, such as SFAI's president Luo Zhongli’s masterpiece "My Father”, etc.

The institute enjoys prestige domestically and internationally. The artwork has contributed to contemporary Chinese art. Since the 1990s, many teachers and students have won national and international awards. Artists from SFAI have exhibited their art internationally.

SFAI has been establishing cultural exchange relations with more and more foreign art institutes, delegations, and artists, dispatching students to study abroad and receiving foreign students to study at SFAI. This outreach has resulted in the promotion of international art exchanges and development. These outstanding artists make contributions to the development of fine arts in China.

The traditional campus was in the district of Jiulongpo, in Chongqing. The new campus was built in Huxi District, Chongqing, in 2005.

The university's philosophy is "close to life, to serve the people; knowledge as equally important, new incentives; open-minded and keeping up with the times". The overall development objective is to provide the highest level of art education in the western region of China.

Departments
Programs of study at SFAI include craft art, oil painting, sculpture, design, architecture, printmaking, art theory, and traditional Chinese painting. (The institute no longer offers Chinese language classes for international and exchange students as a second language at the Huxi campus.)

Alumni
The following at alumni of the Sichuan Fine Arts Institute:

 A Ge
 Qionghui Zou
 Yin Haixin
 Zhang Xiaogang

See also
 Chengdu Art Academy

References

External links
Sichuan Fine Arts Institute website

 
1940 establishments in China
Educational institutions established in 1940
Arts organizations established in 1940
Universities and colleges in Chongqing
Jiulongpo District
Shapingba District